Michael Dibdin (21 March 1947 – 30 March 2007) was a British crime writer, best known for inventing Aurelio Zen, the principal character in 11 crime novels set in Italy.

Early life 
Dibdin was born in Wolverhampton, Staffordshire (now West Midlands), England. The son of a physicist, he was brought up from the age of seven in Lisburn, Northern Ireland, where he attended the Friends' School and was taught by James Simmons. He graduated with a degree in English from Sussex University, and then went to study for a Master's degree at the University of Alberta in Edmonton, Alberta, Canada.

Career 
After publishing his first novel, a Sherlock Holmes pastiche, he lived for four years in Italy, teaching at the university in Perugia.

Dibdin is best known for his Aurelio Zen mysteries, set in Italy. The first of these, Ratking, won the 'Gold Dagger' award of 1988. This series of detective novels provide a penetrating insight into the less visible aspects of Italian society over the last 20 years. The earlier books have a lightness of touch that gradually becomes much darker. The character of Zen himself is anti-heroic, which adds much to the books' irony and black humour. A final Zen book, End Games, appeared posthumously in July 2007.

He also wrote other detective works set in America and in the UK.

Personal life
Dibdin eventually settled in Seattle, Washington, United States.

Dibdin was married three times, most recently to the novelist K. K. Beck. He died in Seattle on 30 March 2007, aged 60, following a short illness.

Bibliography

Aurelio Zen series
 Ratking (1988)
 Vendetta (1991)
 Cabal (1992)
 Dead Lagoon (1994)
 Cosi Fan Tutti (1996)
 A Long Finish (1998)
 Blood Rain (1999)
 And Then You Die (2002)
 Medusa (2003)
 Back to Bologna (2005)
 End Games (2007)

Other books
 The Last Sherlock Holmes Story (1978)
 A Rich Full Death (1986)
 The Tryst (1989)
 Dirty Tricks (1991)
 The Dying of the Light (1993)
 Dark Spectre (1995) 
 Thanksgiving (2000)

References

External links 
 
 BBC obituary
 Daily Telegraph obituary
 January Magazine Interview: Michael Dibdin
 BBC Programme page: Zen

Video 
 Michael Dibdin: "Zen is someone I don't know very much about" – video

1947 births
2007 deaths
writers from Wolverhampton
Alumni of the University of Sussex
Male writers from Northern Ireland
British crime fiction writers
Organized crime novelists
British expatriates in the United States
People educated at Friends' School, Lisburn
20th-century British novelists
21st-century writers from Northern Ireland
20th-century British male writers